Mollie Elizabeth King (born 4 June 1987) is an English pop singer, radio presenter and a member of girl group The Saturdays. As part of the Saturdays, King has had 13 Top 10 and eight Top 5 singles, including the UK number-one hit "What About Us" on the UK Singles Chart and five top-ten albums on the UK Albums Chart. Before The Saturdays, King was a member of another girl group, Fallen Angelz, with whom she appeared on The X Factor. In 2015, King signed a solo deal with Island Records.

In August 2017, King was the first contestant announced for that year's series of BBC's Strictly Come Dancing, partnered with AJ Pritchard. King was eliminated in the semi-final in December 2017, finishing in fifth place. In April 2018, it was announced that King would join Matt Edmondson to co-host a show for BBC Radio 1 beginning in June on Fridays, Saturdays and Sundays.

Life and career

Early life and career beginnings
King was born in Wandsworth, London, England, the youngest of three daughters born to Susan (née Wykes) and Stephen King. She attended Surbiton High School, in Kingston-upon-Thames, London. She has two sisters, Laura Ann (born 1983) and Ellen Catherine (born 1985). King had a successful ski-ing career and was on the Surbiton High Ski team with fellow pupil Chemmy Alcott. By the age of 11, King was a member of the British Children's Ski Team resulting in her receiving a scholarship to the British Ski Academy. King later raced for Great Britain as one of the youngest on the team and later went on to ski for the British Alpine squad although she turned down a ski career to pursue her dream of becoming a singer. King achieved three As in her A levels, in Psychology, Business and Economics, and Sport in spite of having been diagnosed with Dyslexia.

2007–2015: The Saturdays

Since 2007, King has been a member of girl group The Saturdays. The group achieved 13 Top 10 hits, and four Top 10 albums. The girl group released their debut single "If This Is Love" in July 2008, and it peaked at number eight in the UK. The group released a second single "Up" which charted at number five in the UK and later the song was given a Silver Disc in the United Kingdom. In late October 2008, the group released their first studio album Chasing Lights. It charted at number nine in the UK, and went platinum according to the BPI. The group released a third single from the album, "Issues", which also went silver. The Saturdays released a cover of "Just Can't Get Enough" by Depeche Mode. The song debuted at number two in the UK, behind Flo Rida's "Right Round". The fifth and final single from the album was "Work", which was the first single by the group to fail to reach the Top 20. The group later went on a tour entitled The Work Tour. In October 2009, the group released a second studio album, Wordshaker, which charted at number nine and was given silver certification by the BPI. The first single, "Forever Is Over", charted at number two in the UK. The Saturdays appeared in advertisements for several products including a brand of deodorant, tampons, mobile phones, an operating system, and hair removal products. But in early 2010, the girls released a second and final single from their second album, "Ego", which charted at number nine, the single gained a certification of silver by the BPI.

In summer 2010, the Saturdays released their first mini album (their third album overall) Headlines!, which charted at number 3 in the UK and number 10 in Ireland. The band released their eighth single, "Missing You", which charted at number three in the UK and number six in Ireland. Rochelle Wiseman confirmed that the second single from the album would be "Higher" It was later confirmed, by The Saturday's official website that Flo Rida had recorded vocals for "Higher". On Your Radar was the girls' third studio album, reaching a disappointing number 23 in the UK and spending only three weeks in the UK Top 75, but featured the top-ten hits, "All Fired Up" and "Notorious" as well as single, "My Heart Takes Over". In December 2011, the group went on their first headlining arena tour, All Fired Up Tour!

The Saturday's released the first single taken from their fourth studio album "30 Days" in May 2012, which peaked at number seven. Later in the year, they temporarily moved from London to Los Angeles in the hope of breaking America. Helping increase their single sales in America, E! Network broadcast Chasing The Saturdays, a reality TV show following the girls during their three-month stay in America. The show premiered in January 2013, and was cancelled after one series. The band released "What About Us" (featuring rapper Sean Paul) in March 2013, which became their first number one single and was the biggest selling single of the year (at that point). Later on in the year, "Gentleman" and "Disco Love" were released; with both of them charting in the Top 15. Their album Living for the Weekend became the band's fourth Top 10 album. The final single taken from the album was a fan favourite. The radio mix of "Not Giving Up" was released in April 2014 and was their seventeenth Top 40 single. The band went on hiatus in 2014, and released a greatest hits album Finest Selection: The Greatest Hits the same year. The only single released from the album, "What Are You Waiting For?" charted at number 38, making it their lowest-charting single to date.

2015–present: Debut solo album
On 11 October 2015, King confirmed she had signed a solo deal with Island Records, with the intention of releasing a solo album in 2016. Her debut solo single, "Back to You", was released on 19 August 2016. On 24 August 2017 King announced via Instagram that her new single, "Hair Down", would be released on 1 September.

Co-written by King, UK pop group Steps released "To the Beat of My Heart" as the fourth promotional track on 26 November 2020 from their sixth studio album What the Future Holds. The track is believed to be from the recording sessions from her scrapped debut solo album.

Other endeavours

Television
King appeared in a number of episodes of Hollyoaks Later, along with Frankie Sandford. As a part of The Saturdays, she has appeared in BBC series Myths. King has appeared in two episodes of bebo-based online show Sam King portraying herself as an ex-girlfriend. King also appeared on The King is Dead on BBC Three and Never Mind the Buzzcocks in 2010. Along with her colleagues, King appeared on Ghosthunting with... where they look for paranormal activity. She also appeared in a Reality TV show with her bandmates, known as The Saturdays: 24/7. On the show, The Saturdays performed exclusive tracks. In early 2013, The Saturdays appeared in another reality TV documentary about their lives, Chasing The Saturdays. The programme followed the girls as they tried to break into the American market after signing with Island Def Jam Records and Mercury Records. The show aired on TV network E! on Sunday nights. The US premiere received 914,000 viewers. Upon its premiere in the UK, the show received 72,000 views and became the network's most watched show of the week. In October 2013, King appeared as a panellist on an episode of Through the Keyhole. On 28 June 2014, King appeared, with The Saturdays, and competed in a celebrity edition TV show The Cube, where she reached the final round, but did not continue and won £100,000 for her chosen charity, the British Heart Foundation.

On 7 August 2017, King was the first contestant announced to be taking part in the fifteenth series of Strictly Come Dancing on BBC One. She was partnered with AJ Pritchard. On 10 December 2017, King was eliminated from the show's semi-final.

Mollie guest-presented the children's television show Blue Peter on 8 January 2018 in place of usual host Radzi Chinyanganya. In January 2018, she stood in for Dan Wootton for a week on breakfast show Lorraine with the entertainment news. Throughout August she presented This Morning alongside a variety of co-presenters including Ben Shephard, Matt Edmondson and Mark Wright and is now the senior female relief presenter on the show.

Sponsorship deals and autobiography
It was revealed in 2009 that The Saturdays would be the new faces of hair removal product Veet. They later became the new faces of a major campaign for Impulse women's deodorant. The group recorded a television ad, which featured their songs "Forever Is Over" and "Ego". It was also dubbed "The Impulse Diaries". The TV content, which involves a sponsorship package on Channel 4, will show the girls in various settings, including a hotel room, a tour bus and backstage before a gig. This first aired on 23 October. The Saturdays also did a photoshoot, posing on a giant sofa as they launched T-Mobile's Big Sofa Night In campaign in London, United Kingdom. The group sat on the sofa for more than 12 hours, the sofa was the size of a double decker bus. In 2013, King created a collection for Oasis Stores titled 'Loved by Mollie'. During September 2013, King designed shoes to help raise funds for UK charity Save The Children. King also was an ambassador for Maybelline during the Vodafone London Fashion Week. In 2017, King became the face of the Christmas campaign for Boux Avenue lingerie.

In early 2010, The Saturdays were going to publish their autobiography. King later announced that the autobiography would be titled The Saturdays: Our Story. The book was officially released on 25 October 2010. The Saturdays appeared at WH Smith in Bluewater for a book signing on 16 October 2010. The cover of their book cover had a similar cover to their Headlines! album and their The Headlines Tour due to them all being released around the same time. The book gives insight into the world of The Saturdays by telling the tale of their success. King has her own chapter in the book, which she speaks about her love interests, their friendship within the group, and a personal insight into their lives before finding fame. The book also gives fashion and beauty tips, some gossip, accompanied by photos from the girls' own collection.

Philanthropy
It was announced that The Saturdays would record the 2009 Comic Relief charity single, which delayed the release of their fourth single,"Work". The group released a cover of Depeche Mode's "Just Can't Get Enough" for the charity on 1 March 2009. A week later, the song charted at number 2 on the UK Singles Charts making the group the first artist in 14 years for their Comic Relief single not to chart at number 1. In May 2010, the Saturdays teamed up with Manchester United and sang at a pre-match concert at Old Trafford. On 12 September 2010, the girls performed at the Help for Heroes charity concert with over 60,000 fans there. In March 2011, the group appeared at Westfield shopping centre with buckets and asked customers to part with their cash for Marie Curie Cancer Care, which provides nurses to help care for people with terminal cancer. Rochelle stated; "We were collecting money in Westfield, for our charity Marie Curie! We raised a lot I think." The Saturdays also performed at the Sunshine Concert which was held at the Troxy in London; to raise money for charity.

Radio
From February 2018, King co-hosted BBC Radio 1 every Saturday 1pm-4pm, alongside Matt Edmondson. 
In June 2018, King began co-hosting the show full time alongside Edmondson on Fridays, Saturdays and Sundays.

On 17 September 2018, King was nominated for 'Best New Presenter' at the Audio & Radio Industry Awards (ARIAS).

, King co-hosted the BBC Radio 1 weekend breakfast show with Matt Edmondson. From August 2019, King also presented Best New Pop on Friday mornings as well as the breakfast show.

Starting September 2022, King presents Future Pop on BBC Radio 1 (Thursdays, 8pm–10pm).

Personal life
In January 2010, it was announced that King was in a relationship with Lawson member Andy Brown. They broke up in February 2011. Following their split, Brown wrote the songs "When She Was Mine" and "Standing in the Dark" which he said were inspired by his break-up with King. In 2011, King began dating supermodel David Gandy, before ending the relationship in 2012. They rekindled their relationship in 2014, before ending it again in 2016. King is a fan of Britney Spears and cites the singer as a personal influence. King is now engaged to England cricketer Stuart Broad. He proposed on 1 January 2021. In June 2022, King confirmed via Instagram that she was expecting a baby with Broad and, in November 2022, announced via Instagram the birth of their daughter.

Discography

Singles

Music videos

Tours
The Saturdays
 The Work Tour
 The Headlines Tour
 All Fired Up Tour
 Greatest Hits Live!

References

External links

Radio 1's Future Pop (BBC Radio 1)
Matt and Mollie (BBC Radio 1)
Radio 1's Party Anthems (BBC Radio 1)
Official website

1987 births
Living people
Singers from London
The Saturdays members
BBC Radio 1 presenters
People from Wandsworth
People educated at Surbiton High School
Participants in American reality television series
English women pop singers
Musicians with dyslexia
Television presenters with dyslexia